Blatz was an American punk band formed in 1989 in Berkeley, California, United States. Blatz came out of the 924 Gilman Street Project scene during the late 1980s, and early 1990s along with bands like Operation Ivy, Filth, and Green Day.

History
Blatz was an early 1990s East Bay punk band.

Discography

EPs
 Cheaper Than The Beer Lookout! Records (1990) (out of print)
 Cheaper Than The Beer Life Is Abuse Records (2000) (out of print)
 Cheaper Than The Beer Silver Sprocket (2009)
 Mike Montano Live Mike Montano Benefit Show 2003 (2016)

Splits
 Bitches and Brew (split 7-inch single with Tribe 8) Lickout! Records (1992) (identical to Stranger Fruit except for cover)
 The Shit Split (split LP with Filth) Lookout! Records (1991), released as split CD including EP & Split EP  on Lookout! Records (1996) (out of print)
 The Shit Split (split LP with Filth) Life Is Abuse Records (2000), released as split CD including EP & Split EP on Life Is Abuse Records (2000) (out of print)
 The Shit Split (split LP with Filth) Alternative Tentacles (2009), released as split CD including EP & Split EP  on Alternative Tentacles (2009)

Demos
 Banned in R.C (Demo) (1990)

Compilation appearances
 Can of Pork (1992)
 (You're Only As Good As) The Last Great Thing You Did! (1997)
 Later That Same Year (1999)

Members
Robert Eggplant (guitar) (1989–1992)
Joey Perales (drums) (1989–1992)
John Santos (bass) (1989)
Marshall Stax (bass) (1989–1992)
Jesse Luscious (vocals) (1989–1992)
Anna Joy Springer (vocals) (1990–1992)
Annie Lalania (vocals) (1990–1992)

References

External links
Blatz on Alternative Tentacles Records

Alternative Tentacles artists
Musical groups established in 1989
Musical groups disestablished in 1992
Musical groups from Berkeley, California
Punk rock groups from California